Club Deportivo Iztapa, is a Guatemalan football club based in Iztapa, Escuintla Department. It plays their home games in the Estadio Municipal El Morón.
They compete in the Liga Nacional, the top tier of Guatemalan football.

Honours

Domestic Competitions

League
Primera División de Ascenso
Winners (3): Clausura 2017, Apertura 2018, Clausura 2018

Current squad

Managerial history
  Eduardo Acevedo (2009-2010)
  Gustavo Reinoso (2013-2014)
  Jose Luis Torres (2014)
  Francisco Melgar (2016-2019)
  Juan Alberto Salguero (2019)
  Ramiro Cepeda (2019-2022)
  Richard Parra (2022)
  Milton García (2022-2023)
  Pablo Garabello (2023- )

References
https://web.archive.org/web/20190318190740/http://ligaprimeradivision.com/

Football clubs in Guatemala